Sam C. Cook (July 13, 1855 – February 15, 1924) was a judge and state legislator in Mississippi. He served as a justice of the Supreme Court of Mississippi from 1912 to 1921.

Early life 
Sam C. Cook was born on July 13, 1855, in Oxford, Mississippi. He was the son of Milas J. Cook and Martha (Bumpass) Cook. Cook attended the public schools of Oxford, and graduated from the University of Mississippi with a Bachelor of Laws degree in 1878. He then began practicing law in Holmes County, Mississippi, before moving to Batesville, Mississippi, in 1880, and continuing to practice law there.

Career
In 1885, Cook was elected to represent Panola County as a Democrat in the Mississippi House of Representatives and served in the 1886 session. In 1888, he moved to Clarksdale, Mississippi. Cook represented Coahoma County in the House in the 1890, 1892, and 1894 sessions. He was appointed attorney for the Yazoo Mississippi delta levee board in 1900 and served two years. He was appointed circuit Judge of the Eleventh district by former Governor Andrew H. Longino in 1902 and was reappointed by Governors James K. Vardaman Jr. and Edmond Noel.

He was appointed to Mississippi's supreme court by Mississippi governor Earl L. Brewer in 1912 after serving in the state legislature and for two terms as a circuit judge. In 1920, Brewer was challenged in his bid for reelection by William Dozier Anderson. In the closing days of the election, Anderson accused Cook of having become lazy and careless in his opinion writing, and defeated Cook in the primary.

Personal life 
Cook was a Methodist. He married Elizabeth Murphy on October 25, 1882, and they had four children, named Charles, Edwin, Marjorie, and Sam Jr.

See also
List of justices of the Supreme Court of Mississippi

References

1855 births
1924 deaths
Democratic Party members of the Mississippi House of Representatives
Mississippi circuit court judges
Justices of the Mississippi Supreme Court
19th-century American politicians
People from Clarksdale, Mississippi
Mississippi lawyers